Bolimów  is a town in Skierniewice County, Łódź Voivodeship, in central Poland. It is the seat of the Gmina (administrative district) called Gmina Bolimów. The town has a population of 930. It gives its name to the protected area known as Bolimów Landscape Park.

History
Its history dates back to at least 1370, when it was already considered a town. It was a royal town of Poland until the Partitions of Poland. Since 1815, it was located in the Russian Partition. Around 1870, it was one of many towns deprived of its town rights by the Russians as a punishment for the Polish January Uprising.

It was the place where  gas weapons were used for the first time, during First World War, when on 31 January 1915, during the Battle of Bolimów, the German Army shelled Russian army positions with xylyl bromide, a tear gas; the attack was relatively unsuccessful due to low temperature which prevented the gas from vaporising and spreading. A much larger attack with poison gas occurred in the nearby area on 31 May 1915, and Russian army suffered much higher casualties (over several thousand dead).

After the war, in 1918, Poland regained independence and control of the settlement.

Following the joint German-Soviet invasion of Poland, which started World War II in September 1939, it was occupied by Germany until 1945. In 1944, during and after the Warsaw Uprising, the Germans deported several hundreds of Poles (mainly old people and women with children) from the Dulag 121 camp in Pruszków, where they were initially imprisoned, to Bolimów and surrounding villages.

References

Cities and towns in Łódź Voivodeship
Skierniewice County
Łódź Voivodeship (1919–1939)